Zvečevo is a Croatian food company, specializing in confectionery products and spirits. The company was founded as Stock Cognac Medicinal in 1921 in Požega and produced strong alcoholic drinks. The company was rented to Nestlé from 1936 until 1946, when it also started producing chocolate and candy products. The company changed its name to Zvečevo d.d. Požega in 1951. In the 1960s, all efforts were aimed towards production of cocoa products, strong alcoholic drinks and milk powder, as the unprofitable and outdated production of fruit juices and flour was abandoned. A cooperation with Nestlé was established again in 1970 that lasted until 1995, when it became a joint-stock company. Zvečevo has designed the first rice chocolate in the world in 1964 and named it Mikado.

Gallery

External links 
 
 Chocolate wrappers from the 1980s

References

Food and drink companies established in 1921
1921 establishments in Croatia
Croatian chocolate companies
Brand name chocolate
Drink companies of Croatia
Food and drink companies of Croatia
Croatian brands